The following is an incomplete list of Parks and Open Spaces in Northern Ireland.

County Antrim

Belfast

Other
Antrim Lough Shore Park
Ballyboley Forest
Ballycastle Forest
Ballypatrick Forest
Bann Woods North Forest
Bann Woods South Forest
Breen Forest
Capanagh Forest
Carnfunnock Country Park, near Larne
Clare Forest
Cleggan Forest
Craigs Forest
Garry Forest
Glenariff Forest Park
Glenarm Forest
Muckamore Forest
The People's Park, Ballymena
Portglenone Forest
Randalstown Forest
Slieveanorra Forest
Tardree Forest
Woodburn Forest

County Armagh 
Ardress House
Ballymoyer Forest
Camlough Forest
Carnagh Forest
Cold Brae Forest
Craigavon City Park
Derrymore House
Drumbanagher Forest
Fathom Forest
The Fews Forest
Gosford Forest Park
Loughgall Forest
Loughgall Country Park
Lurgan Park
Maghery Country Park
Navan Fort
Oxford Island, Craigavon
Peatlands Park
Seagahan Forest
Slieve Gullion Forest Park

County Down 
Annalong Forest
Ballymenoch Park, Holywood
Ballysallagh Forest
Ballywalter Park
Belvoir Park Forest
Bohill Forest
Castle Ward
Castlewellan Forest Park
Clandeboye Forest
Crawfordsburn Country Park
Delamont Country Park, Killyleagh
Donard Forest
Drumkeeragh Forest
Hillsborough Castle and Gardens
Hillsborough Forest
Hollymount Forest
Kilbroney Park, Rostrevor
Mount Stewart House And Gardens
Mourne Country Park
Mourne Forest
Murlough Nature Reserve
Narrow Water Forest
Quoile Pondage National Nature Reserve
Redburn Country Park
Rostrevor Forest
Rowallane Gardens
Scrabo Tower
Tollymore Forest Park

County Fermanagh 
Ballintempo Forest
Belmore Forest
Big Dog Forest
Carnmore Forest
Carrigan Forest
Castle Archdale
Castle Caldwell Forest
Castle Coole
Clabby Forest
Conagher Forest
Crocknagrally Forest
Crom Estate
Derrylin and Nann Island Forest
Devenish Island
Doon Forest
Ely Lodge Forest
Florence Court Forest Park
Garrison Forest
Grogey Forest
Jenkin Forest
Kesh Forest
Knocks Forest
Lough Navar Forest
Marble Arch Caves Global Geopark
Marlbank Forest
Necarne Forest
Pubble Forest
Riversdale Forest
Silees Forest
Spring Grove Forest
Tully Forest
Tullychurry Forest
White Island, County Fermanagh

County Londonderry 
Aghadowey Forest
Ballykelly Forest
Banagher Glen, Dungiven
Binevenagh Forest
Cam Forest
Creggan Country Park
Derrynoyd Forest
Downhill Forest
Ervey Woods
Garvagh Forest
Glenshane Forest
Gortnamoyagh Forest
Grange Park Forest
Iniscarn Forest
Learmount Forest
Loughermore Forest
Loughermore East Forest
Moyola Forest
Muff Glen Forest
Mussenden Temple and Downhill Demesne
Ness Wood Country Park
Roe Valley Country Park, Limavady
Somerset Forest
Springhill House
Springwell Forest
St. Columb's Park

County Tyrone 
Aghyaran Forest
Altmore Forest
The Argory, Dungannon
Baronscourt Forest
Bradkeel Forest
Caledon Forest
Carrickaholten Forest
Castlederg Forest
Cookstown Forest
Creggan Forest
Davagh Forest Park
Drum Manor Forest Park, Cookstown
Dungannon Park
Dunmoyle Forest
Fardross Forest
Favour Royal Forest
Glenderg Forest
Goles Forest
Gortin Glen Forest Park
Killens Forest
Knockmany Forest
Lack Forest
Ligfordrum Forest
Lough Bradan Forest
Moneygal Forest
Moydamlaght Forest
Mullaghfad Forest
Parkanaur Forest Park
Pigeon Top Forest
Pomeroy Forest
Seskinore Forest
Slievedoo Forest
Trillick Forest

Parks in Northern Ireland
Forests and woodlands of Northern Ireland
Parks
Northern Ireland coast and countryside
Parks in Northern Ireland
Tourist attractions in Northern Ireland